The 2008 District of Columbia Republican presidential primary took place on February 12, 2008. Virginia and Maryland both held primaries on the same day, so the day's elections were collectively called "the Potomac primary".  John McCain decisively won the primary, securing the votes of all 16 DC delegates to the 2008 Republican National Convention.

Results

*Candidate suspended campaign prior to this primary

Mike Huckabee received a plurality of votes in Ward 7. John McCain received a plurality of votes in Ward 5 and Ward 8 and a majority of votes in the other five wards.

See also
 2008 District of Columbia Democratic presidential primary
 2008 Republican Party presidential primaries

References

District of Columbia
2008